Djarthia is an extinct monotypic genus of marsupial. It is the oldest marsupial found in Australia, discovered at the Murgon fossil site in south-eastern Queensland.

D. murgonensis was described from material identified as Early Eocene Tingamarran fauna, first published in 1999.  It was placed with the clade Australidelphia, which includes the marsupials that dispersed throughout Eastern Gondwanan supercontinent during the Eocene and remain extant in Australia and South America. Skeletal material described include a molar, incomplete cochlear and tarsal bone either complete or in fragmented state of preservation.

References

Australidelphia
Eocene mammals of Australia
Eocene marsupials
Transitional fossils
Fossil taxa described in 1999
Prehistoric marsupial genera